Magnolia House, also known as the Johnson-Kinney House, located in Bennettsville, South Carolina, is a fine example of an excellently preserved late antebellum neoclassical, or "bracketed Greek Revival" home in rural South Carolina. Magnolia is a two-story frame house constructed in 1853 by Bennettsville lawyer, William Dalrymple Johnson. Johnson was a signer of the South Carolina Ordinance of Secession.

Notable details of the structure include a one-story porch supported by ten Doric columns, which extends along the northern exposure and front portion of the eastern side. Also, matching double leaf, five paneled doors are at the front and rear entrances, framed by rectangular transoms and sidelights with unusual rectangular pane design. Boxed cornices are bracketed all around. Behind the house are a barn and the old slave quarters, which were built around the year 1853.

References

Houses on the National Register of Historic Places in South Carolina
Houses completed in 1853
Greek Revival houses in South Carolina
Houses in Marlboro County, South Carolina
National Register of Historic Places in Marlboro County, South Carolina
Slave cabins and quarters in the United States